Nizhnesikiyazovo (Tübänge Hikeyaź) is a rural locality (a selo) and the administrative centre of Nizhnesikiyazovsky Selsoviet, Baltachevsky District, Bashkortostan, Russia. The population was 459 as of a country-wide census in 2010. There are 8 streets.

Geography 
Nizhnesikiyazovo is located 16 km north of Starobaltachevo (the district's administrative centre) by road. Tashly-Yelga is the nearest rural locality.

References 

Rural localities in Baltachevsky District